The Wager House is a historic home in Titusville, Florida, United States. It is located at 621 Indian River Avenue. On January 10, 1990, it was added to the U.S. National Register of Historic Places.

References

External links
Brevard County listings at Florida's Office of Cultural and Historical Programs

Houses in Brevard County, Florida
National Register of Historic Places in Brevard County, Florida
Buildings and structures in Titusville, Florida